Adelheid Popp  (11 February 1869 – 7 March 1939) was an Austrian feminist and socialist who worked as a journalist and politician.

Early life

Adelheid Popp, born Adelheid Dworschak, was born 11 February 1869, into a poor working-class family in Inzersdorf, Vienna, Austria (now part of Liesing).  Out of 15 children, only five survived in the family, and Popp was the youngest of the five. Her father, Adalbert, was a weaver and an abusive alcoholic. Popp grew up in a violent environment, and at six years old her father died, leaving the family more impoverished than before. She received three years of formal education, only to have to leave school at the age of 10 to help support her family. She worked briefly as a domestic worker, as a seamstress' apprentice crocheting handkerchiefs, and finally as a factory worker.

In the mid-1880s she became interested in politics. A friend of her brother introduced her to the working class social movement and social democratic newspapers and literature. She read reports about the living conditions of working-class families and related to their struggles, having grown up impoverished herself, and realised that it was not just her: poverty was universal and a product of an unjust society. In 1889 she attended her first public meeting for the Social Democratic Workers Party, with her brother. She was the only woman at the meeting.

Political work

19th century

Popp became active in the Social Democratic Workers Party, and in 1891 she became the party's first female public speaker and official delegate. In 1891, Popp joined the Working Women's Educational Association, which was founded by women active in the social democratic movement in 1890. She would give her first speech at a meeting for the association, inspired by a speaker describing women's working conditions. Popp stood up and shared her own experiences and demanded the need for women's education. After her impromptu speech, the audience, mainly men, applauded and requested written copies of the speech. She became the editor-in-chief of the social women's newspaper, Die Arbeiterinnenzeitung, in October 1892. In 1893 she organized the first strike for women's clothing workers in Vienna. In 1894 she would marry Julius Popp.

For the SDAP, she advocated for a quota, which required a certain number of women's votes during decision making in the Party. She criticized trade unionists for demanding that membership of women's organizations had to be limited to union members, when unions weren't allowing female members in general and because so many women worked in the non-union domestic service sector.

20th century

Popp entered the 20th century creating the Union of Homeworkers in 1902, followed by the Association of Social Democratic Women and Girls in 1907. She would be elected to the Constituent National Assembly and then, as one of seven female Social Democrats, to the Parliament of Austria in 1919. In this role, she was the first woman ever to speak in the parliament.

As a writer

In 1909, Popp published Die Jugendgeschichte einer Arbeiterin (English: The Autobiography of a Working Woman), which explored how class and gender shaped her life choices.  The book focused on her "miserable proletarian childhood and youth," which was used as the focus for her argument demanding social and political change. Following her autobiography, was Haussklavinnen (English: Domestic Slaves), in 1912, which was her study on domestic servants.

Later work and death

During her later years in Parliament, she devoted herself to social legislation and women's issues. Popp proposed bills for family law reform, which focused on overturning men's unlimited power as heads of households. She also fought for the legalization of abortion and equal pay. Despite vocal efforts, the majority of her proposals were voted down due to the conservative opposition majority. In the early 1930s she resigned from Parliament. On 7 May 1939, she died from complications from a stroke, in Vienna.

Legacy

Adelheid Popp is a featured figure on Judy Chicago's installation piece The Dinner Party, being represented as one of the 999 names on the Heritage Floor.

Works
 The Autobiography of a Working Woman, (published anonymously), Foreword by August Bebel, published by Ernst Reinhardt, Munich 1909, new edition: Dietz 1983, 
 Memories; From my Childhood and Girlhood Years. By Adelheid Popp, Stuttgart: Dietz 1915

Notes

References

Bibliography

Chicago, Judy. The Dinner Party: From Creation to Preservation. London: Merrell (2007).

External links

Finding Work: Women Factory Workers by Adelheid Popp from My History Lab.

1869 births
1939 deaths
People from Liesing
Austrian people of Czech descent
Social Democratic Party of Austria politicians
Members of the Constituent National Assembly (Austria)
Members of the National Council (Austria)
Members of the Executive of the Labour and Socialist International
Austrian feminists
Austrian socialist feminists
20th-century Austrian women writers
20th-century Austrian women politicians